Pitura Freska was a reggae music group based in Venice, Italy, consisting of Marco Forieri (saxophone and vocal), Sir Oliver Skardy (Gaetano Scardicchio, vocals), Francesco Duse (guitar), Cristiano Verardo (guitar), Valerio Silvestri (trumpet), Toni Costantini (trombone) and Francesco "Ciuke" Casucci (bass). The name of the group is Venetian dialect for "wet paint".

The band was formed in 1989 and disbanded in 2002, after selling over half a million records. Their repertoire included many songs in Venetian language, as well as in Italian.

Their greatest hit was "Papa Nero" ("Black Pope"), which made it to the 1997 Sanremo Music Festival.

References

External links
The band's official homepage 
Biography of Sir Oliver Skardy 

Italian reggae musical groups
Musicians from Venice
Italian Rastafarians
Musical groups from Veneto